California Wing of Civil Air Patrol (CAP) is the highest echelon of Civil Air Patrol in the state of California. California Wing headquarters are located in Van Nuys, California. California Wing consists of over 3,000 cadet and adult members at over 77 locations across the state of California.

Mission
California Wing performs the three missions of Civil Air Patrol: providing emergency services; offering cadet programs for youth; and providing aerospace education for both CAP members and the general public.

Emergency services
California Wing provides emergency services, including search and rescue missions, disaster relief missions, providing Air Force support, and assisting in counter-drug missions.

In March 2020, members of California Wing partnered with the American Red Cross to serve meals to children in the Los Angeles area while schools remained closed amid the COVID-19 pandemic.

Cadet programs
Youth aged 12–18 may enter a CAP cadet program. At the age of 18, they may become a senior member or stay as a cadet. Cadets that decide to stay as a cadet may continue until they become 21. The cadet program provides a 16 step program covering aerospace education, leadership training, physical fitness and moral leadership. California Wing offers an annual summer encampment for cadets to further their skills.

Aerospace education
Civil Air Patrol provides aerospace education for both volunteer CAP members and the general public. The internal education program for CAP members educates senior and cadet members; the external program for the general public is provided through workshops offered through the nation's education system.

Organization

California Wing is divided into eight groups across the state, with each squadron being assigned as a component of a group based on its geographical location.

Legal protection
Members of Civil Air Patrol who are employed within the borders of California are guaranteed ten days of unpaid leave from their employer when responding to emergencies as a member of Civil Air Patrol, under California Labor Code § 1503.

See also
 California Air National Guard
 California Cadet Corps
 California State Military Reserve

References

External links
 California Wing Civil Air Patrol official website
 Civil Air Patrol – United States Air Force Auxiliary website

Aviation in California
Wings of the Civil Air Patrol
Education in California
Military in California
Organizations based in Los Angeles
Van Nuys, Los Angeles